Sutatenza is a town and municipality in the Eastern Boyacá Province of the department of Boyacá, Colombia. Sutatenza borders Somondoco, Guateque, Tenza and Garagoa.

Etymology 
The name Sutatenza comes from Chibcha and means either "Cloud behind the anchovy" or "Descending to the house of the cacique".

History 
In the time before the Spanish conquest, Sutatenza, situated in the Tenza Valley to the east of the Altiplano Cundiboyacense, was ruled by a cacique called Tenzuzucá or Tenzucá, loyal to the zaque of Hunza. Conquistador Gonzalo Jiménez de Quesada in his quest for El Dorado and the rich emerald deposits of the Muisca Confederation visited Sutatenza in 1537.

Modern Sutatenza was not founded until October 22, 1783.

Economy 
Main economical activities of Sutatenza are agriculture and aviculture. A small salt mine is operated in the vereda Salitre.

Gallery

References 

Municipalities of Boyacá Department
Populated places established in 1783
1783 establishments in the Spanish Empire
Muisca Confederation
Muysccubun